Dick Delgado (June 8, 1931 – July 3, 1991) was an American wrestler. He competed in the men's freestyle flyweight at the 1956 Summer Olympics.

References

1931 births
1991 deaths
American male sport wrestlers
Olympic wrestlers of the United States
Wrestlers at the 1956 Summer Olympics
Sportspeople from San Diego